The Gold Range is a subrange of the Monashee Mountains in the southern British Columbia Interior.  This range originally applied to all of the Monashees between the Arrow Lakes and the Okanagan but today only applies to a narrow stretch of the Monashee Mountains' eastern flank adjoining Upper Arrow Lake, west of the upper Shuswap River.

See also
Columbia Mountains
Mount Begbie
Mount Burnham
Mount English
Mount Macpherson
Mount Tilley

References

Monashee Mountains
Arrow Lakes